Tremore is a small hamlet in the parish of Lanivet in Cornwall, England, United Kingdom. It is very close to the border of the parishes of Lanivet and Withiel.

See also
Tremorebridge

References

Hamlets in Cornwall